Leon Benjamin Kromer (June 25, 1876 – September 6, 1966) was a United States Army officer and American football coach.  From 1934 to 1938, Major General Kromer was the Chief of U. S. Cavalry.  He served as the head football coach at the United States Military Academy in 1901, compiling a record of 5–1–2.

Early life, education, football coaching career
Kromer was born in 1876 in Grand Rapids, Michigan. Kromer graduated from West Point in February 1899 and began his service as a commissioned officer in the 10th Cavalry Regiment. In 1901, Kromer was the head coach for the Army football team, with a record of 5–2–1. The New York Times of 1930s noted that many contemporary U. S. Generals (Kromer, Malin Craig, Dennis E. Nolan, Paul Bunker) were connected by past football experience at West Point. Kromer also fenced for West Point against the Navy.

Military career

In 1918, Kromer served on the Western Front with the 82nd Division. According to his citation for the Distinguished Service Medal award, "As Assistant Chief of Staff of the 82d Division during the St. Mihiel offensive Colonel Kromer displayed military attainments of a high order in the planning of operations of great moment. Later as Assistant Chief of Staff, G-3, 1st Corps, and Assistant Chief of Staff, G-1, 1st Army, during the Meuse-Argonne operations, his initiative, sound judgment, and tireless energy solved difficult problems of traffic control and regulation, playing an important part in the successes achieved."

In the beginning of 1934 Kromer was appointed Chief of Cavalry. His tour began with the 1934 field maneuvers involving Adna R. Chaffee, Jr.'s march from Fort Knox to Fort Riley, a demonstration of mechanized cavalry potential designed to determine how far cavalry had progressed to date. The future of cavalry was uncertain: it either remained the forward reconnaissance element of the Army, or had to develop into a completely new fighting force. Analysis of the maneuvers by Kromer's staff indicated that he seriously considered "marrying machine with the horse". He cautiously envisioned "combat cars (of mechanized cavalry) assisting the horsed cavalry in closing with the enemy."

In a foreword to the 1937 Cavalry Combat Kromer wrote that mobility was antithesis to static warfare; open flanks created by cavalry increased the magnitude of operations supported by horse troops. Only nine of 512 paged in this book were dedicated to mechanization, yet there is evidence that Kromer shared the opinion that if U. S. Cavalry did not mechanize it would disappear as a branch (which is exactly what happened under his successor, John Knowles Herr). Kromer was dissatisfied with the growing organizational rift between horse (Fort Riley) and mechanized (Fort Knox) elements of U. S. Cavalry, and redesigned the structure to close the gap. He endorsed expansion of mechanized units at Fort Knox although shortage of funds ruled out any massive changes. Kromer was an open-minded man who did not perceive mechanization as a threat to horse cavalry: "rather, he tried to adapt to a change and give each a role." By the end of his tenure Kromer embraced the modern concept of mechanized combat and, according to Robert W. Grow, "could have made cavalry the mechanized arm had he been supported by the army's General Staff and senior officers in his own branch."

Later life
Kromer retired in March 1938 and was replaced by John Knowles Herr. From 1941 to 1943, Kromer served as commandant of cadets at Norwich University.

Death and burial
Kromer died in 1966 in Germantown, Maryland.  He was buried at West Point Cemetery in West Point, New York.

Family
In 1907, Kromer married Jane Miller Stotsenburg (1888-1981).  Rosetta Kromer, Kromer's oldest daughter, was a concert pianist and was married to Wade D. Killen.  His oldest son, John S. Kromer, was a West Point graduate who became an Episcopal clergyman. Another son, captain William A. Kromer, became a soldier and was killed in action in Europe January 1, 1945. Another son, Leon B. Kromer Jr. (1912–1999), joined the Navy during World War II. After the war he headed industrial associations and served as labor relations advisor under presidents Kennedy, Johnson and Nixon. Daughter Jane Kromer, married Reverend C. D. Kean.

Head coaching record

Notes

References
 Coffman, Edward (2004).  The regulars: the American Army, 1898-1941. Harvard University Press. .

 Hoffmann, George (2006). Through mobility we conquer: the mechanization of U.S. Cavalry. University Press of Kentucky. .
 Johnson, David (2003). Fast Tanks and Heavy Bombers: Innovation in the U.S. Army, 1917-1945. Cornell University Press. .

1876 births
1966 deaths
19th-century players of American football
United States Army personnel of World War I
United States Army generals
United States Army personnel of World War II
Army Black Knights football coaches
United States Military Academy alumni
Army Black Knights football players
Norwich University faculty
Recipients of the Distinguished Service Medal (US Army)
People from Grand Rapids, Michigan
Military personnel from Michigan